Patania harutai is a moth in the family Crambidae. It was described by Inoue in 1955. It is found in Japan (Honshu), China and the Russian Far East (Amur).

The wingspan is 35–42 mm.

References

Moths described in 1955
Spilomelinae
Moths of Asia